Maria Curcio (27 August 1918 or 191930 March 2009) was an Italian classical pianist who became a sought-after teacher.  Her students included Barry Douglas, Ignat Solzhenitsyn, Martha Argerich, Evelyne Brancart, Radu Lupu, Dame Mitsuko Uchida, Myung-Whun Chung, Leon Fleisher, Rafael Orozco, Christopher Elton, Hilary Coates, Simone Dinnerstein, Massimiliano Mainolfi, Matthew Schellhorn and Geoffrey Tozer.  She was the last student of Artur Schnabel and she passed on his teachings to her own students.

Biography
Maria Curcio was born in Naples in 1918, to an Italian father and a Jewish-Brazilian mother, also a pianist who had studied with a pupil of Ferruccio Busoni. She was playing by age three, and at age seven was taken to Rome to play for Benito Mussolini, but refused to do so.  She was tutored at home to leave more time for practising, but she did not have a happy childhood, as she was pushed into accepting too many engagements too soon, and there was no time to play or have friends. Ottorino Respighi invited her to give a recital at his house. She was accepted to the Naples Conservatory at age nine, receiving her degree by 14. Her mother arranged for her to study with Alfredo Casella and Carlo Zecchi (a pupil of Artur Schnabel) in Italy, and with Nadia Boulanger in Paris. She also studied with Artur Schnabel himself from age 15; he did not normally take young pupils, but his son Karl Ulrich persuaded him to audition her.  When he did so, he described her as "one of the greatest talents I have ever met".  When Schnabel was on tour, she had lessons with Fritz Busch.

She made her London debut in 1939, but at the outbreak of World War II, she was in Amsterdam, where she had followed Schnabel's secretary Peter Diamand, and where she performed frequently.  However, during the German occupation of the Netherlands from 1940, when Jews were banned from playing in public, she turned down all offers of engagements in protest (Diamand was Jewish). Diamand spent some time in a Dutch concentration camp before escaping.  They then needed to hide from the Nazis, in attics and other cramped places, with inadequate food. She became a victim of malnutrition and tuberculosis, unable to even walk properly, let alone play.    Her performing career was now effectively over. She married Diamand in 1948, but she needed years of therapy to restore her power to her legs, arms and fingers. Wilhelm Furtwängler wanted to record with her, but by the time he died in 1954 she still had not recovered sufficient strength.  She did, however, finally return to playing; she collaborated with such artists as Benjamin Britten, Carlo Maria Giulini, Szymon Goldberg, Otto Klemperer, Josef Krips, Pierre Monteux and Elisabeth Schwarzkopf. Her last performance was in 1963.  She then turned to teaching and giving master classes.  She also coached singers at Josef Krips's request when he conducted the Netherlands Opera.

In the meantime, Peter Diamand had been appointed director of the Edinburgh Festival and they had moved to the UK.  She served on the jury of the Leeds International Pianoforte Competition in 1966, and on the jury of the Paloma O'Shea Santander International Piano Competition in 1978. She was appointed Visiting Professor at the Royal Academy of Music, University of London.  She played privately with Sir Clifford Curzon, who had introduced her to Benjamin Britten, Peter Pears and their circle in 1947.  She often played four-hand piano music with Britten.

She and her husband divorced in 1971 after he had a relationship with Marlene Dietrich. She spent her last few years in Porto, Portugal, where she died in March 2009, aged 90.

BBC Scotland made two films about Maria Curcio in the 1980s: Music in Camera: Maria Curcio - Fulfilling a Legacy and Maria Curcio - Piano Teacher.
A documentary of her life, Music Beyond Sound, was made by her student Douglas Ashley in 1993.  He also wrote a book of the same name.

Students
Maria Curcio's students came from many countries, and included:

Pierre-Laurent Aimard
Martha Argerich
Douglas Ashley
Thomas Bartlett
Peter Bithell
Michel Block
Evelyne Brancart
Pietro Maranca
Angela Brownridge
Myung-whun Chung
Rae de Lisle
Simone Dinnerstein
Barry Douglas
Christopher Elton
Hilary Coates
José Feghali
Leon Fleisher
Claude Frank
Peter Frankl
Alan Gampel
Frank Glazer
Anthony Goldstone
Suzanne Goyette
Folke Gräsbeck
Albert Guinovart
Sam Haywood
Jean-François Heisser
Ian Hobson
Niel Immelman
Terence Judd
Angela Kim
Vedat Kosal
Dalia Lazar (her last student)
Eric Le Sage
Radu Lupu
Tessa Nicholson 
Rafael Orozco
Alfredo Perl
Lenia Erodiadou
Massimiliano Mainolfi
Matti Raekallio
Matthew Schellhorn
Ignat Solzhenitsyn
Yevgeny Sudbin
Sergio Tiempo
Hugh Tinney
Geoffrey Tozer
Inon Barnatan
Mitsuko Uchida.
Douglas Weeks

References

1910s births
2009 deaths
Italian classical pianists
Italian women pianists
Italian music educators
Academics of the Royal Academy of Music
Piano pedagogues
Pupils of Artur Schnabel
Musicians from Naples
20th-century classical pianists
20th-century Italian musicians
Women music educators
Women classical pianists
20th-century Italian women
20th-century women pianists